The Bishop of Bermuda is an episcopal title given to the ordinary of the Anglican Church of Bermuda, one of six extra-provincial Anglican churches within the  Church of England overseen by the Archbishop of Canterbury. The present Bishop is Nick Dill.

From the date of official colonisation in 1612 (three years after Bermuda had been settled by the wreck of the Sea Venture, the survivors of which included the Reverend Richard Buck, who carried out the first Church of England services in Bermuda) until 1825, the nine parishes of the Church of England in Bermuda had rarely enough ministers, and there was no local Bishop, and indeed no colonial bishop, until Charles Inglis became the first Bishop of the Diocese of Nova Scotia (covering present-day New Brunswick, Newfoundland, Nova Scotia, Prince Edward Island and Quebec) in 1787. From 1825 to 1839, Bermuda was attached to the Diocese of Nova Scotia and Prince Edward Island. Subsequently, Newfoundland and Bermuda were separated as the Diocese of Newfoundland, with Aubrey George Spencer as the first Bishop.

The Synod of the Church of England in Bermuda was formed in 1879, and a Diocese of Bermuda became separate from the Diocese of Newfoundland, but they continued to be grouped under the Bishop of Newfoundland and Bermuda until 1919, when Newfoundland and Bermuda each received its own Bishop.

List of the Bishops of Bermuda

References

 
Extra-provincial Anglican churches
Bermuda
Anglican Church of Bermuda
Lists of Bermudian people